UnitingCare Health is a large not-for-profit private hospital group in Australia. It is part of UnitingCare Australia.

It is composed over 5 separate facilities:

 Wesley Hospital (Brisbane)
 St Andrew's War Memorial Hospital
 Buderim Private Hospital, Buderim
 St Stephen's Hospital, Maryborough, Queensland
 St Stephen's Hospital, Hervey Bay

References 

Medical and health organisations based in Queensland